The 2000 Wellington Sevens was an rugby sevens tournament that took place at the Westpac Stadium in Wellington between the 4–5 February 2000. It was the first edition of the Wellington Sevens and the fifth round of the 1999-2000 World Sevens Series.

After finishing on top of Pool B with three straight wins, Fiji took out their third sevens title of the season defeating hosts, New Zealand 24-14 in the cup final to regain the series lead. Canada took out the plate final while France won the bowl final over Croatia.

Teams
Sixteen national teams played in the Wellington Sevens with the announcement of teams being revealed on the 21 January 2000.

Pool stage
The pool stage was played on the first day of the tournament. The 16 teams were separated into four pools of four teams and teams in the same pool played each other once. The top two teams in each pool advanced to the Cup quarterfinals to compete for the 2000 Wellington Sevens title.

Pool A

Source: World Rugby

Source: World Rugby

Pool B

Source: World Rugby

Source: World Rugby

Pool C

Source: World Rugby

Source: World Rugby

Pool D

Source: World Rugby

Source: World Rugby

Finals

Bowl

Source: World Rugby

Plate

Source: World Rugby

Cup

Source: World Rugby

Tournament placings

Source: Rugby7.com

References

2000
Wellington Sevens
Well
February 2000 sports events in New Zealand